The men's high jump event at the 1961 Summer Universiade was held at the Vasil Levski National Stadium in Sofia, Bulgaria, with the final on 31 August 1961.

Medalists

Results

Qualifications

Final

References

Athletics at the 1961 Summer Universiade
1961